Dong Fang Dushi Guangbo (Chinese: 东方都市广播 (dong fang du shi guang bo) [tʊŋ faŋ tu ʂɨ kwaŋ pwɔ]), whose full callsign is East City Radio of Shanghai People's Radio Station (Chinese: 上海人民广播电台东方都市广播 (shang hai ren min guang bo dian tai dong fang du shi guang bo) [ʂaŋ xaj ʐən min kwaŋ pwɔ tjɛn tʰaj tʊŋ faŋ tu ʂɨ kwaŋ pwɔ]), also known as FM 899 Driving FM (Chinese:八九九驾车调频 (ba jiu jiu jia che tiao pin) [pa tɕjɔw tɕjɔw tɕja ʈʂʰɤ tʰjaw pʰin]), is a city affairs radio station in Shanghai in the People's Republic of China, broadcasting at both 792 AM and 89.9 FM.

Its former callsign, Dong Fang Guangbo Dian Tai (Chinese: 东方广播电台 (dong fang guang bo dian tai) [tʊŋ faŋ kwaŋ pwɔ tjɛn tʰaj], literally "East Radio Station"), refers to the former Shanghai East Radio Company. And its frequencies, 792 AM and 89.9 FM, were inherited from former Shanghai East Radio Company too.

The radio station is now operated by SMG Raydio Centre, which is a part of the Shanghai Media Group.

External links
 FM 899 Official website
  Official website of Shanghai East Radio Company

Radio stations in China
Shanghai Media Group